Yea, Ye-A, YEA, or yea may refer to:

An archaic form of yes, the opposite of nay

Places 
Yea, Victoria, a town in Australia
Yea River, Victoria, Australia
Shire of Yea, Victoria, Australia, a former local government area

People 
Lacy Walter Giles Yea (1808–1855), British Army colonel who distinguished himself in the Crimean War
Philip Yea (born 1954), British businessman and investor
Yea baronets

Other uses 
 General and Speciality Workers' Union, a former trade union in Finland
 Yea Chronicle, a weekly newspaper  in Victoria, Australia
 IATA airport code for all airports serving Edmonton, Alberta, Canada: Edmonton International Airport and Edmonton City Centre Airport
 yea, ISO 639-3 code for the Ravula language, spoken in Karnataka, India

See also
Yeah (disambiguation)